Ute Enzenauer (born 18 January 1965) is a former West German road racing cyclist active from 1981 to 1987. Born in Ludwigshafen-Friesenheim, Rheinland-Pfalz, Enzenauer was selected from school at age 9 as a cyclist. She won the West German National Championships in 1979 and 1980. In 1981 she became the youngest World Champion ever, winning Women's World Road Championships at age 16. She raced the 1984 Olympic Games in Los Angeles, California finishing 8th. After finishing 3rd place overall in 1987 Women's Tour de France (Grande Boucle), she retired from the sport.

References

External links

1965 births
Living people
German female cyclists
Olympic cyclists of West Germany
Cyclists at the 1984 Summer Olympics
Sportspeople from Ludwigshafen
Cyclists from Rhineland-Palatinate
UCI Road World Champions (women)